Aimoto (愛本 or 相本) is a Japanese surname. Notable people with the surname include:

, Japanese manga artist
, Japanese actress and voice actress

See also
Aimoto Station (disambiguation), multiple railway stations in Japan
10853 Aimoto, a main-belt minor planet

Japanese-language surnames